Senator Conley may refer to:

Benjamin F. Conley (1815–1886), Georgia State Senate
Gerard Conley Jr. (born c. 1954), Maine State Senate
Gerard Conley Sr. (1930–2018), Maine State Senate
William Conley Jr. (born 1953), Rhode Island State Senate

See also
Senator Connelly (disambiguation)